Norton Junction railway station served the village of Norton, County Durham, England from 1835 to 1870 on the Clarence Railway.

History 
The station was poorly located for the village of Norton and so it closed to both passengers and goods traffic in July 1870 by the North Eastern Railway to be replaced by Norton-on-Tees station, a short distance to the east along the Port Clarence branch.

References

External links 

Disused railway stations in County Durham
Former North Eastern Railway (UK) stations
Railway stations in Great Britain opened in 1835
Railway stations in Great Britain closed in 1870
1835 establishments in England
1870 disestablishments in England